Dunvegan Parish Church (also known as Duirinish Parish Church) is a parish church in the Church of Scotland at Dunvegan on the Isle of Skye in Scotland.

History

The church was built between 1823 and 1832 in the Gothic Revival style.  It is a Category A listed building.

References

Church of Scotland churches in Scotland
Churches in the Isle of Skye
Churches completed in 1832
Category A listed buildings in Highland (council area)
Listed churches in Scotland